Howard Transit was the primary public transit system in Howard County, Maryland, which grew from the former ColumBus bus system in Columbia, Maryland.  First Transit replaced Veolia Transport as the operating company in July 2007.

Howard Transit was replaced by the Regional Transportation Agency of Central Maryland in 2014.

History
In 1975, the Howard County Council announced plans to create a subsidized bus system for Columbia. Councilmembers Ruth Keeton and Virginia Thomas introduced legislation for Howard County to manage public transportation with a nine-member board.

Routes 
Howard Transit operated eight routes designated by colors to various parts of Howard County and surrounding areas:

Notes:
Transfers:
Blue Line = Baltimore Light Rail (operated by MTA Maryland)
CRT = Connect-a-Ride
HT = Howard Transit
MARC = Maryland Area Regional Commuter (operated by MTA Maryland)
Metrobus = Metrobus (operated by WMATA)
MTA = Maryland Transit Administration or MTA Maryland
All routes except Purple Route have connection to the Mall in Columbia. The Purple Route meets the Gold and Silver Routes at the Maryland Food Center. The Red, Silver, and Brown Routes'' all meet at Snowden Square shopping center in east Columbia.

Defunct routes

Blue Route -- traveled from Clarksville to the Mall in Columbia.  Service eliminated as of July 9, 2010.

References

External links
Howard Transit website
Video of Howard Transit Bus activity

Bus transportation in Maryland
Howard County, Maryland